Emma was launched at Calcutta in 1813. From 1814 she made several voyages between India and England under a license from the British East India Company (EIC). A hurricane wrecked her on 4 January 1821 at Table Bay, Cape of Good Hope.

Career
Emma entered Lloyd's Register in 1818 with G. Mitchett, master, Hal & Co., owner, and trade Liverpool–India. She entered the Register of Shipping in 1819 with Michell, master, Hall & Co., owner, and trade Liverpool–Calcutta. However, she had been sailing between India and London before that.

Incidents
Emma, country ship, Cripps, master, was among the vessels that arrived at Saint Helena on 13 July 1815 and left on the 17th, bound for India. 
A report from the Cape of Good Hope dated 13 September 1817, stated that Emma, Mitchell, master, from Bengal, had damaged part of her cargo. She would unload that at the Cape, and then sail to South America and the Mediterranean. However, on 18 October, before Emma could leave Table Bay, Strickland, master, broke free of her cables and ran afoul of Emma, carrying away her fore yard.

Voyages to India from England under EIC license

Fate
Lloyd's Register for 1821 showed Emmas master as Baumgarda and her owner as Paxton & Co. On 4 January 1821 a hurricane struck Table Bay and wrecked three vessels; one was Emma, Baumgart, master. She had been sailing from London to Bengal. Most of the cargoes were saved, as were the crews.

Notes

Citations

References
 
 

1813 ships
British ships built in India
Age of Sail merchant ships of England
Maritime incidents in January 1821